Malki Varshets is a village in the municipality of Sevlievo, in Gabrovo Province, in northern central Bulgaria.

References

Villages in Gabrovo Province